Dilawar Syed is a Pakistani-American businessman, entrepreneur, and government official. He currently serves as Special Representative for Commercial and Business Affairs at the United States Department of State. He is President’s Biden's nominee to serve as deputy administrator of the Small Business Administration.

Early life and education 

Syed immigrated to the United States from Pakistan as a college student to attend the College of Wooster in Ohio. Syed earned his Bachelor of Arts in economics and computer science from the University of Texas at Austin and a Master of Business Administration from the Wharton School of the University of Pennsylvania.

Career 

Syed has been an entrepreneur for 20 years; he has built and run companies in the fields of software, consumer, and now health care and artificial intelligence. He was the president of Freshworks, where he helped scale the software company's products to thousands of small and medium businesses. He is also the founding chair of the California Entrepreneurship Task Force within the Governor's Office of Business and Economic Development. During the COVID-19 pandemic, he served as a member of the Silicon Valley Recovery Roundtable and was tasked with helping lead the region's economic recovery. He served on the White House Initiative on Asian Americans and Pacific Islanders (AAPIs) from 2010 to 2014 and chaired the White House Initiative on AAPIs' Economic Growth Committee. In that role, Syed led the administration's engagement with small businesses across the U.S. after the passage of the American Recovery and Reinvestment Act of 2009. Syed also served as a liaison with the Small Business Administration and the United States Department of Commerce on federal initiatives such as the President's Export Council. Since 2018, he has been the president and CEO of Lumiata, an artificial intelligence for healthcare company.

Deputy Administrator of the Small Business Administration 

On March 3, 2021, President Joe Biden nominated Syed to be the deputy administrator of the Small Business Administration. His nomination was then sent to the Senate and is pending before the Senate Small Business and Entrepreneurship Committee. In June his nomination was favorably voted out of the Committee in a voice vote but the parliamentarian ruled a roll call vote was required. Since then, Republican members have repeatedly not attended committee meetings denying the quorum needed to take a roll call vote on his nomination. Republicans have conditioned his roll call vote on the SBA taking action on loans Planned Parenthood affiliates received under the Trump Administration. Republicans suggested that Syed's Muslim faith and work with Emerge Action implied he might be anti-Israel, but Jewish and other religious and civil rights organizations defended Syed, and GOP senators discontinued this allegation.

Syed's nomination has been backed by more than 200 business, civil rights, and faith groups. In addition, he has been endorsed by the United States Chamber of Commerce. On January 3, 2022, his nomination was returned to the President under Rule XXXI, Paragraph 6 of the United States Senate. On January 4, 2022, his renomination was sent to the Senate. His nomination is pending before the Senate Committee on Small Business and Entrepreneurship. If confirmed, he would be the highest ranking Muslim-American in the Biden administration.

On January 3, 2023, President Biden renominated Syed for Deputy Administrator of the SBA.

Special Representative for Commercial and Business Affairs 
In February 2022, Syed was appointed as the special representative for commercial and business affairs in the Bureau of Economic and Business Affairs at the Department of State. As Special Representative, he drives commercial diplomacy and advances trade, commercial, and economic policies for American companies and workers.

Commercial and economic engagement

Syed drives commercial diplomacy at the State Department. His office's mission is to promote the U.S. private sector abroad and ensure there is "a level playing field for [US] companies to compete and win". In 2022, he embarked on ten bilateral visits to promote U.S. commercial interests overseas. In March 2022, Syed joined Commerce Secretary Gina Raimondo and Senator Roy Blunt on a presidential delegation to commemorate U.S. National Day at the Expo 2020 Dubai.

In July 2022, Syed visited South Asia, touring India, Pakistan, and Bangladesh. In India, he emphasized the potential of U.S.-India trade to ease global supply chain challenges, saying that "India can play a big role in plugging the gaps in emerging areas such as semiconductors, pharma, and renewable energy".

In September 2022, Syed co-chaired economic dialogue between the U.S. and the United Arab Emirates in Abu Dhabi. This covered a breadth of topics including sanctions, Open RAN 5G technology, cybersecurity, the digital economy and interoperability, women’s economic empowerment, intellectual property, clean energy initiatives, food and water security, global health security, and health cooperation.

In a November 2022 visit to Japan, Syed pushed for the "revival of the semiconductor industry" in Japan to help alleviate microchip supply chain challenges.

References

External links 
 

Year of birth missing (living people)
Living people
21st-century American businesspeople
American people of Pakistani descent
Obama administration personnel
Pakistani emigrants to the United States
People from California
University of Texas at Austin alumni
Wharton School of the University of Pennsylvania alumni